Oleg Moiseyevich Kagan (Russian: Оле́г Моисе́евич Кага́н; 22 November 1946 Yuzhno-Sakhalinsk, Russian SFSR – 15 July 1990, Munich, West Germany) was a Soviet violinist, known for his chamber collaborations with such musicians as pianist Sviatoslav Richter and cellist Natalia Gutman, his wife. He was also a significant proponent of modern music, in particular Berg's Violin Concerto. Several recently released concert recordings have added to his posthumous reputation.

Biography 

Born in Sakhalin, Kagan was brought up in Riga following his family's relocation to the Latvian Soviet Socialist Republic in 1953. He began studying at the Latvian State Conservatory in Riga at age eight under Joachim Braun; five years later, he was taken to Moscow by violinist Boris Kuznetsov. 

During the 1960s, he won the Sibelius and Bach Competitions, while also placing in the top-five of the Enescu and Tchaikovsky Competitions. Upon Kuznetsov's death, Kagan began studying with David Oistrakh, and in 1969, he began playing chamber music with Richter.  Along with Richter and Gutman, Kagan also appeared frequently with pianist Vasily Lobanov, who would later dedicate a piece to him.

As Kagan seemed to be approaching the zenith of his career he became seriously ill with cancer in 1989. He had several surgeries, but struggled to remain active, touring Europe when he could and arranging festivals. Though his doctors at a hospital in Lübeck, Germany declared him too sick to be released, Kagan discharged himself to appear at his final festival, in Kreuth am Tegernsee, Bavaria. Shortly after giving two Mozart concerts there, where he had to be helped on-stage, he died on 15 July  1990, aged 43.

Selected recordings 
 J.S. Bach Violin Sonatas and Partitas, BWV 1001–1006, 1989, Release Date: 2008.

References 

1946 births
1990 deaths
People from Yuzhno-Sakhalinsk
Deaths from cancer in the Soviet Union
International Jean Sibelius Violin Competition prize-winners
Soviet classical violinists
Jewish classical violinists
20th-century classical violinists
Male classical violinists
Soviet Jews
Latvian Academy of Music alumni
20th-century Russian male musicians